The decibel watt (dBW or dBW) is a unit for the measurement of the strength of a signal expressed in decibels relative to one watt. It is used because of its capability to express both very large and very small values of power in a short range of number; e.g., 1 milliwatt = −30 dBW, 1 watt = 0 dBW, 10 watts = 10 dBW, 100 watts = 20 dBW, and 1,000,000 W = 60 dBW.

and also

Compare dBW to dBm, which is referenced to one milliwatt (0.001 W).

A given dBW value expressed in dBm is always 30 more because 1 watt is 1,000 milliwatts, and a ratio of 1,000 (in power) is 30 dB; e.g., 10 dBm (10 mW) is equal to −20 dBW (0.01 W).

In the SI system the non SI modifier decibel (dB) is not permitted for use directly alongside SI units so the dBW is not directly permitted but 10 dBW may be written 10 dB (1 watt).

See also 
dBm

References 

Sound
Units of power
Logarithmic scales of measurement